Kutonen or VI divisioona is the seventh level in the Finnish football league system and comprises 265 teams. The VI divisioona was introduced in 1973 and in the mid-1990s became known as the Kutonen (Number Six in English and Sexan in Swedish).

The competition 
There are 265 clubs in the Kutonen, divided in 27 groups of 5 to 16 teams, each representing a geographical area. During the course of a season (starting in April and ending in October) each club normally plays the others twice, once at their home ground and once at that of their opponents. However in those divisions with more than 12 teams, the competition is arranged so that teams play each other once. The top team in each Kutonen group is normally promoted or qualifies for a promotion playoff to the Vitonen. In the Helsinki divisions the lowest placed teams may be relegated to the Seiska.

Administration

District Football Associations
The Kutonen is administered by 7 of the District Football Associations of the Football Association of Finland (SPL). Responsibilities for the 27 sections are divided as follows:

 SPL Helsinki - 4 sections 
 SPL Uusimaa - 6 sections
 SPL Kaakkois-Suomi - 3 sections
 SPL Keski-Pohjanmaa  - 3 sections 
 SPL Vaasa  - 3 sections
 SPL Tampere - 5 sections
 SPL Turku - 3 sections

Teams within the Kutonen are eligible to compete in the Suomen Cup and the Suomen Regions' Cup. The clubs are normally listed in an abbreviated form and their full names can be viewed by referring to the List of clubs or the relevant District Association.

2012 Season

References

External links
Finnish FA
ResultCode

 
7